The Journal of Intellectual Property Law & Practice is a monthly peer-reviewed law journal covering intellectual property law and practice, published by Oxford University Press.

Contributions range from concise "Current Intelligence" articles, "Practice Points" focusing upon how to optimise a particular aspect of IP practice, as well as lengthier articles and book reviews. The journal is supplemented by a blog.

The journal was established in November 2005. The founding editor-in-chief was Jeremy Phillips (Queen Mary Intellectual Property Research Institute). The current editors are Eleonora Rosati (Stockholm University and Bird & Bird) and Stefano Barazza (Swansea University).

See also
List of intellectual property law journals

References

External links

Intellectual property law journals
British law journals
Publications established in 2005
Oxford University Press academic journals
Monthly journals